John Linus McAtee (October 5, 1898 – November 15, 1963) was an American Hall of Fame jockey in Thoroughbred horse racing.

Biography
Born in Frenchtown, New Jersey on October 5, 1898, he went by his middle name, Linus, but was nicknamed "Pony" by friends and would be called that by some in the press. While still an apprentice, he rode for Commander J. K. L. Ross in Canada then was aboard his colt Damrosch for the win in the 1916 Preakness Stakes.

Called one of the best riders of his era by the National Museum of Racing and Hall of Fame, McAtee developed into a superior tactician who won two Kentucky Derbys and who was the United States Champion Jockey in money earned for 1928. After retiring from racing in 1932, a comeback attempt three years later ended after he suffered a serious foot injury. In 1956, he was inducted in the United States' Racing Hall of Fame. McAtee died on November 15, 1963.

References

1898 births
1963 deaths
American jockeys
American Champion jockeys
United States Thoroughbred Racing Hall of Fame inductees
People from Frenchtown, New Jersey